Cordova Town Center is a side platformed Sacramento RT light rail station in Rancho Cordova, California, United States. The station was opened on June 11, 2004, and is operated by the Sacramento Regional Transit District. It is served by the Gold Line. It is located near the intersection of Olson Drive/Cordova Lane and Folsom Boulevard and serves the nearby Rancho Cordova Town Center and a variety of shopping destinations.

Cordova Town Center, along with Zinfandel and Sunrise, opened on June 11, 2004, as part of an $89 million,  extension of the Gold Line east of the Mather Field/Mills station. Rancho Cordova city officials have stated the establishment of the stations will help in the development of transit-oriented development/redevelopment of the Folsom corridor through the city.

Platforms and tracks

References

Sacramento Regional Transit light rail stations
Rancho Cordova, California
Railway stations in the United States opened in 2004